The Central Florida Expressway Authority (CFX) is a highway authority responsible for construction, maintenance and operation of toll roads in six counties of Greater Orlando (Lake, Orange, Osceola, Polk, Seminole, and Brevard Counties). It was created in 2014 to replace the Orlando–Orange County Expressway Authority (OOCEA), which only had authority in Orange County, and as of 2016 no roads outside that county have been added to the system. Other toll roads in the area are operated by Florida's Turnpike Enterprise (successor to the Seminole County Expressway Authority) and the Osceola County Expressway Authority; with the latter of which possibly merging into CFX some time after 2018.

The Wekiva Parkway, the final piece of a beltway around Orlando, is planned for completion through Lake and Orange Counties by the end of 2023.

CFX operates an electronic toll collection system known as E-PASS, one of the first systems of its kind in the United States. Use of the state's SunPass system is also available on CFX roads. On November 9, 2017, it was announced that CFX would join the E-ZPass group.  CFX began accepting E-ZPass as a form of payment starting on September 1, 2018, but only on roads which they maintain.

Jurisdiction
The following roads were built and/or are maintained by CFX. Some roads share jurisdiction with other agencies – either Florida's Turnpike Enterprise or the Florida Department of Transportation, or have multiple agencies maintaining different portions of the road.

  SR 408 (Spessard L. Holland East–West Expressway): from Florida's Turnpike in Gotha to Challenger Parkway in Alafaya
  SR 414 (John Land Apopka Expressway): from SR 429 / US 441 in Apopka to SR 414 / US 441 in Lockhart, continuing east as FDOT-maintained (non-tolled) Maitland Boulevard
  SR 417 (Central Florida GreeneWay): from I-4 in Celebration to I-4 in Sanford
  SR 429 (Daniel Webster Western Beltway): from I-4 in Four Corners to CR 435 near Mount Plymouth
  SR 429 (Wekiva Parkway): a nearly completed extension of the Western Beltway that will connect to I-4/ SR 417 in Sanford and complete a full beltway around Orlando. The ramp from I-4 west to SR 429 opened to traffic on October 21, 2022 with remaining ramps scheduled to open in 2023.
  SR 451: a short spur route in Apopka connecting SR 414 / SR 429 to US 441
  SR 453 (Mount Dora Connector): a short spur route to Sorrento connecting SR 429 to SR 46
  SR 528 (Martin Andersen Beachline Expressway): from I-4 in Orlando to SR A1A near Cape Canaveral
  SR 538 (Poinciana Parkway): from US 17 / US 92 in Loughman to CR 580 in Poinciana
 SR 551 (Goldenrod Road Extension): an unsigned extension of SR 551 in Orlando connecting the FDOT-maintained (non-tolled) state road with SR 528 near the Orlando International Airport

History
CFX was founded in 1963 for the purpose of building the Bee Line Expressway, and soon built the East-West Expressway.

Many sections of the current expressway system, such as the connection of SR 528 from Sand Lake Road to I-4, the sections of SR 417 in Seminole and Osceola counties, and SR 429 south of Seidel Road, were built by the Florida's Turnpike Enterprise, and their toll facilities are managed by the same.

Beginning in 2007, CFX began transitioning its signage from FHWA Series E modified typeface to signs that use the new Clearview typeface.

The newest addition to the CFX system is an extension of Maitland Boulevard (State Road 414) known as the John Land Apopka Expressway. The expressway opened on May 15, 2009. The project was inherited from the Florida Department of Transportation, which referred to it as the "Apopka Bypass". Planning is also underway for an extension of State Road 429 known as the Wekiva Parkway.  In addition, SR 408 underwent a massive overhaul, including the relocation of its two main toll plazas, large sections of widening, and expansion of a bridge over Lake Underhill.

In 2010, CFX was attempting to keep the average toll to $0.11 per mile.

The current 25-year plan, the "2040 Master Plan", was approved in May 2016. Included are two new toll connections to Brevard County (including an extension of SR 408), a southern bypass of SR 417 to Florida's Turnpike south of St. Cloud, a connection bypassing the three remaining signalized intersections on SR 414, and a connection from the Western Beltway to U.S. Highway 27 south of Clermont.

A 2013 grand jury investigation into the CFX, found a "culture of corruption," involving gifts and campaign donations. CFX was criticized for firing the Director who was attempting to stop this corruption, replacing him with a legislator with no experience of running a toll operation. The job paid over $175,000 annually.

Canceled projects
The Central Connector, known by the Florida Department of Transportation as State Road 529 (SR 529), was a proposed tollway planned to parallel Orange Avenue (SR 527) between downtown Orlando and the Beachline Expressway. The project was canceled in 1991 after much local opposition.

References

External links
Central Florida Expressway Authority

 
Transportation in Orange County, Florida
Toll road authorities of the United States